Ronald Dunn (born 9 June 1943) is an Ecuadorian sports shooter. He competed in the men's 25 metre rapid fire pistol event at the 1984 Summer Olympics.

References

External links
 
 

1943 births
Living people
Ecuadorian male sport shooters
Olympic shooters of Ecuador
Shooters at the 1984 Summer Olympics
Place of birth missing (living people)
Shooters at the 1983 Pan American Games
Pan American Games gold medalists for Ecuador
Medalists at the 1983 Pan American Games
Pan American Games medalists in shooting